Gretton railway station was a railway station near Gretton, Northamptonshire. It was on the Nottingham direct line of the Midland Railway of the Midland Railway. The steps up to the former platforms can still be seen, but the station building itself is in private ownership.

As of 2014 the station buildings still remain, though in private ownership. The station itself is an interesting two storey building situated on a viaduct on the edge of the village - easily visible on the road from Rockingham (which itself has a disused station).

References

Disused railway stations in Northamptonshire
Beeching closures in England
Former Midland Railway stations
Railway stations in Great Britain opened in 1880
Railway stations in Great Britain closed in 1966